Barlocco is a surname. Notable people with the surname include:

Enzo Barlocco (born 1944), Italian water polo player
Luca Barlocco (born 1995), Italian footballer
Martín Barlocco (born 1977), Uruguayan footballer